Nicolas de Angelis (born 1949) is a French classical guitarist.

Early years
Born in Saint-Cloud, a west Parisian suburb along the shores of the Seine River, de Angelis studied guitar at the Paris Academy from the age of ten.
De Angelis started the guitar with a teacher from the Paris Academy who first inspired his great love of the instrument.

At sixteen he belonged to a small group of very talented French musicians, among them Michel Berger.  
From the age of eighteen, he lent his talent to many pop stars such as Julien Clerc, Sylvie Vartan and Fabienne Thibault, composer and clarinettist Jean-Christian Michel, and soon became one of the most requested session musicians.

Song for Anna
In 1981 he recorded his first solo LP, Quelques Notes Pour Anna.  This album achieved Gold record sales within a few weeks, and paved the way for his further successes.

Discography
 1981 Quelques notes pour Anna
 1982 Amour mon Amour
 1985 Grand Concert 
 1985 Guitar Guitar (AUS #40)
 1985 Jalouse (Toute la guitar)
 1985 Les Sonates (with Richard Clayderman)
 1986 L'amour à plein coeur
 1986 Romantic Rendez-vous
 1987 Soleil
 1996 Love follow us
 1997 Love follow us 2
 1998 Friends France
 1998 Le Meilleur de la guitare

See also
List of guitarists
Delphine Records

References

 http://www.delphine-artists.co.uk/nicolas_de_angelis.htm
 http://www.midomi.com/index.php?action=main.artist_bio&name=NicolasdeAngelis&from=artist_overview

External links
 Nicolas de Angelis homepage

1949 births
Living people
People from Saint-Cloud
French classical guitarists
French male guitarists
French pop guitarists